Vidim te kad (English: I See You When) is a 1999 album by Serbian pop singer Ana Stanić. The album was released in summer 1998.

The album contains 14 songs, including one 35 seconds intro and one bonus track (a lead single remix). Three singles were released and videos were shot for all the three singles off the album.

Track list 
 "Intro" — 0:35
 "Taj koji zna" — 3:34
 "Nepokret" — 3:15
 "Tamno nebo" — 3:56
 "Brodovi" — 3:28
 "Skrivanje" — 3:17
 "O Sreći" — 3:51
 "Svetionik" — 3:56
 "Vidim te kad..." — 4:23
 "Neon" — 3:41
 "Jutro posle" — 3:27
 "Obale sna" — 3:41
 "Staze do tebe" — 3:44
 "Vidim te kad... (Andrej Aćin Remix)" (Hidden Track)

Similarities  
 The chorus melody of the Ana Stanić's song "Taj koji zna" is borrowed from the Madonna's song "Like A Prayer".

External links 
 Official Website of Ana Stanić
 On: www.discogs.com

1998 albums